Cho Dependent is the first studio album (sixth album, including her stand-up comedy releases) from American actress and comedian Margaret Cho. Released on August 24, 2010, as her debut album for Clownery Records, it earned a nomination for a 2011 Grammy award for Best Comedy Album. Cho supported the album by releasing music videos for four songs: "Intervention", "I'm Sorry", "Eat Shit and Die", and "Lice".

Track listing

Singles and videos 
 "I'm Sorry" (2010)
 "Eat Shit and Die" (2010)
 "Lice" (2010)
 "Intervention" (2010)
 "Captain Cameltoe" (2011)
 "Hey Big Dog" (2011)
 "Asian Adjacent" (2011)
 "Baby I'm with the Band" (2011)

Non-album tracks 
 "I Cho Am a Woman" (2008)
 "My Lil' Wayne" (2010)
 "No Offense" (2010)

Reception 

The album debuted at #3 on the Billboard Top Comedy Albums chart for the week of September 11, 2010.

References 

2010 debut albums
Margaret Cho albums
2010s comedy albums